The Damage, Inc. Tour was a concert tour by American heavy metal band Metallica in support of the band's third studio album, Master of Puppets. The name of the tour is taken from the last song on the album. It began on March 27, 1986, and ended on February 13, 1987.

Background
Metallica supported Ozzy Osbourne from March to August, headlined a string of U.S. dates between May 23 and June 7 with Armored Saint, and were the main act throughout the fall and winter with support from Anthrax and Metal Church. Roadie John Marshall, who later played guitar in Metal Church, filled in for James Hetfield on rhythm guitar between July 27 and September 25 following a mid-tour skateboarding accident resulting in a broken arm. Hetfield, Cliff Burton and Kirk Hammett had discussed firing Lars Ulrich upon completion of the tour, but plans were set aside upon the death of Burton on September 27, 1986, in a tour bus accident near Ljungby, Sweden, while en route from Stockholm to Copenhagen, Denmark. Performances that were scheduled for October were postponed and the band hired a new bassist, Jason Newsted, to complete the rest of the tour on October 28, 1986. Metallica also became the first band of the Big Four to cross the Iron Curtain, with two concerts in Katowice, Poland, on February 10 and 11, 1987.

Setlist

Songs played overall
"The Ecstasy of Gold" ("Ennio Morricone") [Audio introduction]
"Battery"
"Master of Puppets"
"For Whom the Bell Tolls"
"Welcome Home (Sanitarium)"
"Ride the Lightning"
"(Anesthesia) Pulling Teeth" (3/27-9/26/1986)-> "Jason Newsted bass solo" (11/15/1986-2/13/1987)
"Whiplash"
"The Thing That Should Not Be"
"Fade to Black"
"Seek & Destroy"
"Creeping Death"[1st encore]
"Disposable Heroes"
"The Four Horsemen"
"Kirk Hammett guitar solo"
"Am I Evil?" ("Diamond Head" cover)
"Damage Inc."[2nd encore]
"Fight Fire with Fire"
"Blitzkrieg" ("Blitzkrieg" cover)
"Last Caress" ("The Misfits" cover) [final encore]

Typical setlist
"The Ecstasy of Gold" ("Ennio Morricone") [Audio introduction]
"Battery"
"Master of Puppets"
"For Whom the Bell Tolls"
"Welcome Home (Sanitarium)"
"Ride the Lightning"
"(Anesthesia) Pulling Teeth" (3/27-9/26/1986)-> "Jason Newsted bass solo" (11/15/1986-2/13/1987)
"Whiplash"
"The Thing That Should Not Be"
"Fade to Black"
"Seek & Destroy"[1st encore]
"Creeping Death"
"The Four Horsemen"
"Kirk Hammett guitar solo"
"Am I Evil?" ("Diamond Head" cover)
"Damage Inc."

Cliff Burton tour
"The Ecstasy of Gold" ("Ennio Morricone") [Audio introduction]
"Battery"
"Master of Puppets"
"For Whom the Bell Tolls"
"Welcome Home (Sanitarium)"
"Ride the Lightning"
"(Anesthesia) Pulling Teeth"
"Whiplash"
"The Thing That Should Not Be"
"Fade to Black"
"Seek & Destroy"
"Creeping Death"[1st encore]
"Disposable Heroes"
"The Four Horsemen"
"Kirk Hammett guitar solo"
"Am I Evil?" ("Diamond Head" cover)
"Damage Inc."[final encore]
"Fight Fire with Fire"
"Blitzkrieg" ("Blitzkrieg" cover)

Cliff Burton U.S. Shows
"The Ecstasy of Gold" ("Ennio Morricone") [Audio introduction]
"Battery"
"Master of Puppets"
"For Whom the Bell Tolls"
"Ride the Lightning"
"Welcome Home (Sanitarium)"
"The Thing That Should Not Be"
"(Anesthesia) Pulling Teeth"
"The Four Horsemen"
"Fade to Black"
"Seek & Destroy"[1st encore]
"Creeping Death"
"Am I Evil?" ("Diamond Head" Cover)[2nd encore]
"Disposable Heroes'
"Kirk Hammett guitar solo"
"Damage Inc."
"Whiplash" [final encore]

Supporting Ozzy
"The Ecstasy of Gold" ("Ennio Morricone") [Audio introduction]
"Battery"
"Master of Puppets" 
"For Whom the Bell Tolls"
"Ride the Lightning"
"Welcome Home (Sanitarium)"
"(Anesthesia) Pulling Teeth"
"Thing That Should Not Be"
"Fade to Black"
"Seek & Destroy"
"Creeping Death"[1st encore]	 	 
"Am I Evil?" ("Diamond Head" cover)
"Damage Inc."
"Whiplash" [Final encore]

Supported by Armored Saint
"The Ecstasy of Gold" ("Ennio Morricone") [Audio introduction]
"Battery"
"Master of Puppets"
"For Whom the Bell Tolls"
"Ride the Lightning"
"Welcome Home (Sanitarium)"
"The Four Horsemen"
"The Thing That Should Not Be"
"(Anesthesia) Pulling Teeth"
"Damage Inc."
"Fade to Black"
"Seek & Destroy"
"Creeping Death"[1st encore]
"Disposable Heroes"
"Kirk Hammett guitar solo"
"Am I Evil?" ("Diamond Head" cover)
"Whiplash" [final encore]

Iowa Jam (1986)
"The Ecstasy of Gold" ("Ennio Morricone") [Audio introduction]
"Battery"
"Master of Puppets"
"For Whom the Bell Tolls"
"Fade to Black"
"Seek & Destroy"
"Creeping Death"[encore]
"Am I Evil?" ("Diamond Head" cover)
"Damage Inc."

Cliff Burton European Leg
"The Ecstasy of Gold" ("Ennio Morricone") [Audio introduction]
"Battery"
"Master of Puppets"
"For Whom the Bell Tolls"
"Welcome Home (Sanitarium)"
"Ride the Lightning"
"(Anesthesia) Pulling Teeth"
"Whiplash"
"Thing That Should Not Be"
"Fade to Black"
"Seek & Destroy"[1st encore]
"Creeping Death"
"The Four Horsemen"
"Kirk Hammett guitar solo"
"Am I Evil?" ("Diamond Head" cover)
"Damage Inc."[final encore]
"Fight Fire with Fire"
"Blitzkrieg" ("Blitzkrieg" cover)

"Puss in Boots Rock" Festival (1986)
"The Ecstasy of Gold" ("Ennio Morricone") [Audio introduction]
"Battery"
"Master of Puppets"
"For Whom the Bell Tolls"
"Welcome Home (Sanitarium)"
"(Anesthesia) Pulling Teeth"
"Whiplash"
"Fade to Black"
"Seek & Destroy"
"Creeping Death"[encore]
"Am I Evil?" ("Diamond Head" cover)
"Damage Inc."

Roskilde Festival (1986)
"The Ecstasy of Gold" ("Ennio Morricone") [Audio introduction]
"Battery"
"Master of Puppets"
"For Whom the Bell Tolls"
"Welcome Home (Sanitarium)"
"(Anesthesia) Pulling Teeth"
"The Four Horsemen"
"Fade to Black"
"Seek & Destroy"
"Creeping Death"[1st encore]
"Am I Evil?" ("Diamond Head" cover)
"Damage Inc."
"Whiplash" [final encore]

Jason Newsted tour
"The Ecstasy of Gold" ("Ennio Morricone") [Audio introduction]
"Battery"
"Master of Puppets"
"For Whom the Bell Tolls"
"Welcome Home (Sanitarium)"
"Ride the Lightning"
"Jason Newsted bass solo"
"Whiplash"
"The Thing That Should Not Be"
"Fade to Black"
"Seek & Destroy"
"Creeping Death"[1st encore]
"The Four Horsemen"
"Kirk Hammett guitar solo"
"Am I Evil?" ("Diamond Head" cover)
"Damage Inc."[2nd encore]
"Fight Fire with Fire"

Jason Newsted warm-up gigs
"The Ecstasy of Gold" ("Ennio Morricone") [Audio introduction]
"Battery"
"Master of Puppets"
"For Whom the Bell Tolls"
"Welcome Home (Sanitarium)"
"Ride the Lightning"
"Kirk Hammett guitar solo"
"Whiplash"
"Seek & Destroy"
"Creeping Death"[1st encore]
"The Four Horsemen"
"Fade to Black"
"Am I Evil?" ("Diamond Head" cover)
"Damage Inc."
"Fight Fire with Fire" [final encore]

Tour dates

Personnel
March – September 1986:
 James Hetfield – lead vocals, rhythm guitar
 Lars Ulrich – drums
 Cliff Burton – bass, backing vocals
 Kirk Hammett – lead guitar, backing vocals
 John Marshall – rhythm guitar (July 27 – September 25)

October 1986 – February 1987:
 James Hetfield – lead vocals, rhythm guitar
 Lars Ulrich – drums
 Kirk Hammett – lead guitar, backing vocals
 Jason Newsted – bass, backing vocals

References

Sources

1986 concert tours
1987 concert tours
Metallica concert tours